The micro-pulling-down (μ-PD) method is a crystal growth technique based on continuous transport of the melted substance through micro-channel(s) made in a crucible bottom.  Continuous solidification of the melt is progressed on a liquid/solid interface positioned under the crucible.  In a steady state, both the melt and the crystal are pulled-down with a constant (but generally different) velocity.

Many different types of crystal are grown by this technique, including  Y3Al5O12, Si, Si-Ge, LiNbO3, 
α-Al2O3, Y2O3, Sc2O3, 
LiF, CaF2, BaF2, etc.

Crystal growth routine

Standard routine procedure used in the growth of most of μ-PD crystals is well developed.  The general stages of the growths include:

	Charging of the crucible with starting materials (mixture of powders)
	Heating of the crucible until starting materials in the crucible are completely melted
	Upward displacement of the seed until its contact with the meniscus or crucible
	Formation of the meniscus and partial melting of the seed top
	Correction of the shape of the meniscus through appropriate adjustment of crucible temperature and position of the seed crystal
	Crystal growth through pulling of the seed in downward direction
	Separation of the as grown crystal from the meniscus
	Cooling of the system (including the crystal and the crucible) to room temperature

See also
Crystal growth
Czochralski process
Float-zone silicon
Flux method
Laser-heated pedestal growth
Shaping processes in crystal growth
Verneuil process

Lithium niobate
Sapphire
Scandium(III) oxide
Yttrium aluminium garnet

References

Chemical processes
Industrial processes
Semiconductor growth
Crystals
Methods of crystal growth